Sam Kai Vui Kun, known also as Kuan Tai Temple, is located in front of St. Dominic’s Market Complex, near Senado Square in Sé, Macau, China. The temple was built in 1750.

Kuan Tai is the Anglicized spelling of Lord Guan, an important general during the Three Kingdoms period in China, being now honored and worshiped in Taoism, Confucianism and Chinese Buddhism.

History
In 2005, the temple became one of the designated sites of the Historic Centre of Macau enlisted on UNESCO World Heritage List.

See also 
 A-Ma Temple, built in 1488
 Kun Iam Temple, built in 1627
 Tam Kung Temple (Macau), built in 1862
 Na Tcha Temple, built in 1888
 Martial temple
 Man Mo Temple (Hong Kong)
 Kwan Tai temples in Hong Kong
 Hip Tin temples in Hong Kong

References

External links
 
 Description on macauheritage.net 

Historic Centre of Macau
Sé, Macau
Classical Lingnan-style buildings
Landmarks in Macau
Taoist temples in Macau
Religious buildings and structures completed in 1792